Breakfast with the Leader is a 1953 Soviet drama film directed by Anatoli Rybakov and starring Tatyana Barysheva.

Cast
 Tatyana Barysheva as Kaurova 
 Andrey Fayt 
 Aleksandr Khvylya as Alupkin  
 Grigoriy Shpigel as Balagaleyev  
 Mikhail Troyanovsky as Pekhteryev

References

Bibliography 
 Goble, Alan. The Complete Index to Literary Sources in Film. Walter de Gruyter, 1999.

External links 
 

1953 films
1953 drama films
Soviet drama films
1950s Russian-language films
Films based on works by Ivan Turgenev
Mosfilm films
Soviet black-and-white films